Altadis is a Spanish-French multinational purveyor and manufacturer of cigarettes, tobacco and cigars. Through its international holdings, including ownership of the former Consolidated Cigar Holdings and half ownership of the Cuban state tobacco monopoly, Habanos S.A., Altadis was the largest producer of mass market and premium cigars in the world, as well as the fourth largest producer of tobacco products.

The company was acquired by the British tobacco giant Imperial Tobacco (now Imperial Brands) in 2008, becoming a subsidiary of it.

Company history

French and Spanish state monopolies

In 1926, France concentrated its tobacco industry into a single state-run monopoly called SEIT. The production of matches was added to the state monopoly's purview in 1935 and the company was renamed SEITA.

Following the end of World War II, Spain similarly established a state-owned tobacco monopoly called , commonly known as Tabacalera.

Throughout the decades of the 1960s and 1970s, national markets were gradually opened up to the importation of foreign tobacco brands and the national tobacco monopolies of both France and Spain were weakened and gradually privatized, with SEITA employees losing status as civil servants in 1962 and the company losing both its monopoly of tobacco cultivation and tobacco sales by 1971.

Acquisitions

 purchased Consolidated Cigar Holdings Inc. of Fort Lauderdale in the United States. Consolidated Cigar was a large purveyor of cigars such as the Dominican made editions of Romeo y Julieta and Montecristo.

In August 2000, Consolidated Cigar and Havatampa, owned by Tabacalera, merged to form Altadis USA.

In September 2000 Altadis purchased a 50% interest in the Cuban state tobacco monopoly, Habanos SA.

In 2003, Altadis acquired the internet seller 800-JR Cigar, Inc., one of the largest cigar retailers in the United States.

2008 sale
On 18 July 2007, the board of Altadis backed a €16.2 billion offer for the company by Imperial Tobacco (now Imperial Brands). The acquisition was cleared by the Spanish stock market regulator on 7 November 2007, paving the way for the creation of the world's fourth largest tobacco company. The acquisition was completed on 25 February 2008 with the delisting of Altadis from the Bolsa de Madrid.

Sales
Western Europe's third largest cigarette manufacturer, Altadis produced and sold blond, regular and dark cigarettes. Its major markets included the United States, Spain and France.

In 2004, Altadis Group economic sales rose 3.9% to euro 3.518 million with a staff of 27,500 people.

Appointments 
In January 2019, Altadis announced new heads of sales and consumer marketing, in the face of Paul Waller and Brad Winstead.

Cigarettes

Blond tobacco 

 Anfa
 Balkan Star (BS)
 Brooklyn
 Colt
 Ducados
 Fine
 Fortuna
 Fox
 Gauloises Blondes
 Iris
 Marquise
 News
 Nobel
 Popularne
 Prima
 Royale
 Smart
 Spike
 ZK (Golden Ring)

Black tobacco 
 Gitanes
 Habanos
 Casa Sports
 BN
 Ducados

Cigars

Premium 

 Don Diego
 Flor de Copan
 H. Upmann
 José Piedra 
 Longchamp
 Montecristo
 Pleiades 
 Por Larrañaga
 Quintero
 Romeo y Julieta
 Santa Damiana 
 VegaFina  
 Siglo Limited Reserve

Popular 

 Antonio y Cleopatra 
 Ducados Cigarros
 Dutch Masters
 Dux 
 Entrefinos 
 El Producto  
 Farias 
 Fleur de Savane 
 Guantanamera
 Havanitos 
 Henry Clay
 Niñas 
 Phillies
 Picaduros 
 Tampa Nugget

Other

Rolling tobacco 
 Amsterdamer
 Kennings
 Gauloises
 Picadura Ideales
 Picadura Selecta
 Picadura Fina
 Horizon

Logistic

 Logista 
 Régie des Tabacs 
 Rouge Papier
 Nordipa
 LPM Promodern

Notes

References

External links 

 

Manufacturing companies established in 1999
Tobacco companies of Spain
Manufacturing companies based in Madrid
Conglomerate companies of Spain
Cigar manufacturing companies
Imperial Brands
1999 establishments in Spain
2008 mergers and acquisitions